As an E number, E472 may refer to:

 E472a: acetic acid esters of mono- and diglycerides of fatty acids
 E472b: lactic acid esters of mono- and diglycerides of fatty acids
 E472c: citric acid esters of mono- and diglycerides of fatty acids
 E472d: tartaric acid esters of mono- and diglycerides of fatty acids
 E472e: mono- and diacetyltartaric acid esters of mono- and diglycerides of fatty acids
 E472f: mixed acetic and tartaric acid esters of mono- and diglycerides of fatty acids